Dormitoryo (International title: The Dormitory / ) is a 2013 Philippine television drama thriller series broadcast by GMA Network. Directed by Jun Lana, it stars Lauren Young, Joyce Ching, Enzo Pineda, Ruru Madrid and Wynwyn Marquez. It premiered on September 22, 2013. The series concluded on December 22, 2013, with a total of 13 episodes.

The series is streaming online on YouTube.

Cast and characters

Lead cast
 Lauren Young as Hazel "Haze" Mendoza / Hazel Benitez
 Enzo Pineda as Barney "Burn" Chavez
 Joyce Ching as Margarita "Airiz" de Ocampo
 Ruru Madrid as Charlie Chavez
 Wynwyn Marquez as Maika "Mykee" Benitez / Danica Benitez

Recurring cast
 Mayton Eugenio as Weng Dimaguiba
 Ashley Ortega as Rose Angeles
 Mel Kimura as Rona Sancuevas
 Yassi Pressman as Sophie
 Julian Trono as Kobe
 Sanya Lopez as Thea
 Gabbi Garcia as Gemma

Production

Development
The idea for the series was conceived when GMA Network wanted to put "something new" on their Sunday-afternoon block, which traditionally dominated with either teeny bop series or showbiz-oriented talk shows. And so, the network's drama department decided to "try something different on that block." Jun Lana wanted a show that represent "Generation X" and explore some relevant issues faced by the youth today, including bullying, peer pressure, dysfunctional relationships, infidelity, sibling rivalry, vague sense of morality, dishonesty and even crime. So he decided to come up with an edgy teen series with mystery-filled plot, twists and turns, wherein the lead characters deal with the controversial death of a colleague and peel away secrets that link them with each other. Lana presented the concept and the network found it to be interesting. The show is set in the fictional dormitory—the Holy Spirit Manor. The series creator had to decide on whether the setting should be inside a school or outside of it. It went through the approval and timeslot matching stages.

Casting
The cast was announced during the story conference held in August 2013, with the main cast being Lauren Young together with Joyce Ching, Enzo Pineda, Ruru Madrid and Wynwyn Marquez. The lead role Hazel Mendoza was originally intended for singer-actress Julie Anne San Jose, but the network pulled her out for another TV project. Lauren Young was chosen to replace San Jose for the said role, while the antagonist Airiz de Ocampo, the role which originally intended for Young, went to Joyce Ching. Enzo Pineda and Ruru Madrid were cast as Burn and Charlie Chavez, brothers and Hazel's love interests.

Filming
The series was supposed to premiere in August but it needed some "fine-tuning" before getting the go-signal to tape the pilot episode. Production began on September 4, 2013. The entire series was shot in Tagaytay. The dormitory, (as well as the school) used in the show is actually Divine Word Seminary—a seminary retreat house located also in Tagaytay. The series premiered on September 22, 2013, at 2:00 p.m. timeslot. Dormitoryo is slated to run for only one season, comprising thirteen episodes. But according to Ali Nokom-Dedicatoria, the show's program manager, "[...] if the ratings are good, we can extend it and do another 'dormitoryo' story (it could take another genre)."

Ratings
According to AGB Nielsen Philippines' Mega Manila household television ratings, the pilot episode of Dormitoryo earned a 16.5% rating. While the final episode scored a 9.6% rating.

Accolades

References

External links
 

2013 Philippine television series debuts
2013 Philippine television series endings
Filipino-language television shows
GMA Network drama series
Philippine teen drama television series
Television shows set in the Philippines